Poecilobdella is a genus of Asian leeches belonging to the family Hirudinidae.  Together with the genus Hirudinaria, they have been called Asian buffalo (or cattle) leeches.

Species
The Global Biodiversity Information Facility lists:
 Poecilobdella blanchardi (Moore, 1901) - type species- previously placed in subgenus: Limnatis (Poecilobdella) Blanchard, 1893
 Poecilobdella hubeiensis Yang, 1980
 Poecilobdella nanjingensis Yang, 1996
Now placed in the genus Hirudinaria:
 Poecilobdella javanica (Wahlberg, 1855)
 Poecilobdella manillensis (Lesson, 1842)

References

External links

Annelid genera
Leeches